The 2016 Recopa Sudamericana was the 24th edition of the Recopa Sudamericana, the football competition organized by CONMEBOL between the winners of the previous season's two major South American club tournaments, the Copa Libertadores and the Copa Sudamericana.

The competition was contested in two-legged home-and-away format between Argentine team River Plate, the 2015 Copa Libertadores champion, and Colombian team Santa Fe, the 2015 Copa Sudamericana champion. The first leg was hosted by Santa Fe at Estadio El Campín in Bogotá on 18 August 2016, while the second leg was hosted by River Plate at Estadio Antonio Vespucio Liberti in Buenos Aires on 25 August 2016.

River Plate defeated Santa Fe 2–1 on aggregate to win their second Recopa Sudamericana title, repeating their triumph in 2015.

Format
The Recopa Sudamericana was played on a home-and-away two-legged basis, with the Copa Libertadores champion hosting the second leg. If tied on aggregate, the away goals rule would not be used, and 30 minutes of extra time would be played. If still tied after extra time, the penalty shoot-out would be used to determine the winner.

Teams

Venues

Matches

First leg

Second leg

References

2016
2016 in South American football
Club Atlético River Plate matches
Independiente Santa Fe matches
2016 in Argentine football
2016 in Colombian football
2016 Recopa Sudamericana
2016 Recopa Sudamericana
August 2016 sports events in South America